In mathematics, more specifically in general topology and related branches, a net or Moore–Smith sequence is a generalization of the notion of a sequence. In essence, a sequence is a function whose domain is the natural numbers. The codomain of this function is usually some topological space.

The motivation for generalizing the notion of a sequence is that, in the context of topology, sequences do not fully encode all information about functions between topological spaces. In particular, the following two conditions are, in general, not equivalent for a map  between topological spaces  and :

The map  is continuous in the topological sense;

While condition 1 always guarantees condition 2, the converse is not necessarily true if the topological spaces are not both first-countable. In particular, the two conditions are equivalent for metric spaces. The spaces for which the converse holds are the sequential spaces.

The concept of a net, first introduced by E. H. Moore and Herman L. Smith in 1922, is to generalize the notion of a sequence so that the above conditions (with "sequence" being replaced by "net" in condition 2) are in fact equivalent for all maps of topological spaces. In particular, rather than being defined on a countable linearly ordered set, a net is defined on an arbitrary directed set. This allows for theorems similar to the assertion that the conditions 1 and 2 above are equivalent to hold in the context of topological spaces that do not necessarily have a countable or linearly ordered neighbourhood basis around a point. Therefore, while sequences do not encode sufficient information about functions between topological spaces, nets do, because collections of open sets in topological spaces are much like directed sets in behavior. The term "net" was coined by John L. Kelley.

Nets are one of the many tools used in topology to generalize certain concepts that may not be general enough in the context of metric spaces. A related notion, that of the filter, was developed in 1937 by Henri Cartan.

Definitions

Elements of a net's domain are called its . 
In words, this property means that given any two elements (of ), there is always some element that is "above" both of them (that is, that is greater than or equal to each of them); in this way, directed sets generalize the notion of "a direction" in a mathematically rigorous way. 
The natural numbers  together with the usual integer comparison  preorder form the archetypical example of a directed set. Importantly though, unlike the natural numbers, directed sets are  required to be total orders or even partial orders. 
Moreover, directed sets are allowed to have greatest elements and/or maximal elements, which is the reason why when using nets, caution is advised when using the induced strict preorder  instead of the original (non-strict) preorder ; in particular, if a directed set  has a greatest element  then there does  exist any  such that  (in contrast, there  exists some  such that ).

Nets are frequently denoted using notation that is similar to (and inspired by) that used with sequences. 
A net in  may be denoted by  where unless there is reason to think otherwise, it should automatically be assumed that the set  is directed and that its associated preorder is denoted by  
However, notation for nets varies with some authors using, for instance, angled brackets  instead of parentheses. 
As in the field of algebraic topology, the filled disk or "bullet" denotes the location where arguments to the net (that is, elements  of the net's domain) are placed; it helps emphasize that the net is a function and also reduces the number of indices and other symbols that must be written when referring to it later.

Nets are primarily used in the fields of Analysis and Topology, where they are used to characterize many important topological properties that (in general), sequences are unable to characterize (this shortcoming of sequences motivated the study of sequential spaces and Fréchet–Urysohn spaces). Nets are intimately related to filters, which are also often used in topology. Every net may be associated with a filter and every filter may be associated with a net, where the properties of these associated objects are closely tied together (see the article about Filters in topology for more details). Nets directly generalize sequences and they may often be used very similarly to sequences. Consequently, the learning curve for using nets is typically much less steep than that for filters, which is why many mathematicians, especially analysts, prefer them over filters. However, filters, and especially ultrafilters, have some important technical advantages over nets that ultimately result in nets being encountered much less often than filters outside of the fields of Analysis and Topology.

A subnet is not merely the restriction of a net  to a directed subset of  see the linked page for a definition.

Examples of nets

Every non-empty totally ordered set is directed. Therefore, every function on such a set is a net. In particular, the natural numbers with the usual order form such a set, and a sequence is a function on the natural numbers, so every sequence is a net.

Another important example is as follows. Given a point  in a topological space, let  denote the set of all neighbourhoods containing  Then  is a directed set, where the direction is given by reverse inclusion, so that  if and only if  is contained in  For  let  be a point in  Then  is a net. As  increases with respect to  the points  in the net are constrained to lie in decreasing neighbourhoods of  so intuitively speaking, we are led to the idea that  must tend towards  in some sense. We can make this limiting concept precise.

A subnet of a sequence is  necessarily a sequence. 
For an example, let  and let  for every  so that  is the constant zero sequence. 
Let  be directed by the usual order  and let  for each  
Define  by letting  be the ceiling of  
The map  is an order morphism whose image is cofinal in its codomain and  holds for every  This shows that  is a subnet of the sequence  (where this subnet is not a subsequence of  because it is not even a sequence since its domain is an uncountable set).

Limits of nets

A net  is said to be  or   a set  if there exists some  such that for every  with  the point  
And it is said to be  or   if for every  there exists some  such that  and  

for every open neighborhood  of  the net  is eventually in 

The example net given above on the neighborhood system of a point  does indeed converge to  according to this definition.

Notation for limits

where if the topological space  is clear from context then the words "in " may be omitted.

where an equals sign is used in place of the arrow  In a Hausdorff space, every net has at most one limit so the limit of a convergent net in a Hausdorff space is always unique. 
Some authors instead use the notation "" to mean  with also requiring that the limit be unique; however, if this notation is defined in this way then the equals sign  is no longer guaranteed to denote a transitive relationship and so no longer denotes equality.

Bases and subbases

Convergence in metric spaces

In plain English, this characterization says that a net converges to a point in a metric space if and only if the distance between the net and the point converges to zero. 
If  is a normed space (or a seminormed space) then  in  if and only if  in  where 

Convergence in topological subspaces

Limits in a Cartesian product

A net in the product space has a limit if and only if each projection has a limit.

Explicitly, let  be topological spaces, endow their Cartesian product 

denote the result of "plugging  into ", which results in the net  
It is sometimes useful to think of this definition in terms of function composition: the net  is equal to the composition of the net  with the projection  that is, 

Tychonoff's theorem and relation to the axiom of choice

However, the axiom of choice might be need to be assumed in order to conclude that this tuple  exists; the axiom of choice is not needed in some situations, such as when  is finite or when every  is the  limit of the net  (because then there is nothing to choose between), which happens for example, when every  is a Hausdorff space.

The axiom of choice is equivalent to Tychonoff's theorem, which states that the product of any collection of compact topological spaces is compact. 
But if every compact space is also Hausdorff, then the so called "Tychonoff's theorem for compact Hausdorff spaces" can be used instead, which is equivalent to the ultrafilter lemma and so strictly weaker than the axiom of choice. 
Nets can be used to give short proofs of both version of Tychonoff's theorem by using the characterization of net convergence given above together with the fact that a space is compact if and only if every net has a convergent subnet.

Cluster points of a net

A point  is a cluster point of a given net if and only if it has a subset that converges to 

where  for each  
If  is a cluster point of some subnet of  then  is also a cluster point of

Ultranets

Ultranets are closely related to ultrafilters. 

Every constant net is an ultranet. Every subnet of an ultranet is an ultranet. Every net has some subnet that is an ultranet. 

Given  an ultranet clusters at  if and only it converges to

Examples of limits of nets

Every limit of a sequence and limit of a function can be interpreted as a limit of a net (as described below). 

The definition of the value of a Riemann integral can be interpreted as a limit of a net of Riemann sums where the net's directed set is the set of all partitions of the interval of integration, partially ordered by inclusion.

Interpret the set  of all functions with prototype  as the Cartesian product  (by identifying a function  with the tuple  and conversely) and endow it with the product topology. Let  denote the set of all functions  that are equal to  everywhere except for at most finitely many points (that is, such that the set  is finite).

Examples

Sequence in a topological space

A sequence  in a topological space  can be considered a net in  defined on 

The net is eventually in a subset  of  if there exists an  such that for every integer  the point  is in 

So  if and only if for every neighborhood  of  the net is eventually in 

The net is frequently in a subset  of  if and only if for every  there exists some integer  such that  that is, if and only if infinitely many elements of the sequence are in  Thus a point  is a cluster point of the net if and only if every neighborhood  of  contains infinitely many elements of the sequence.

Function from a metric space to a topological space

Given any function with domain  its restriction to  can be canonically interpreted as a net directed by  

A net  is eventually in a subset  of a topological space  if and only if there exists some  such that for every  satisfying  the point  is in  

Consequently, a point  is a cluster point of the net  if and only if for every neighborhood  of  the net is frequently in

Function from a well-ordered set to a topological space

It is eventually in a subset  of  if there exists an  such that for every  the point  is in 

The net  is frequently in a subset  of  if and only if for every  there exists some  such that 

A point  is a cluster point of the net  if and only if for every neighborhood  of  the net is frequently in 

The first example is a special case of this with 

See also ordinal-indexed sequence.

Subnets

The analogue of "subsequence" for nets is the notion of a "subnet". There are several different non-equivalent definitions of "subnet" and this article will use the definition introduced in 1970 by Stephen Willard, which is as follows: 
 
The map  is called  and an  if whenever  then  
The set  being  in  means that for every  there exists some  such that

Properties

Virtually all concepts of topology can be rephrased in the language of nets and limits. This may be useful to guide the intuition since the notion of limit of a net is very similar to that of limit of a sequence. The following set of theorems and lemmas help cement that similarity:

Characterizations of topological properties

Closed sets and closure

A subset  is closed in  if and only if every limit point of every convergent net in  necessarily belongs to  

Open sets and characterizations of topologies

It is these characterizations of "open subset" that allow nets to characterize topologies. 
Topologies can also be characterized by closed subsets since a set is open if and only if its complement is closed. So the characterizations of "closed set" in terms of nets can also be used to characterize topologies. 

Continuity

A function  between topological spaces is continuous at a given point  if and only if for every net  in its domain, if  in  then  in  
Said more succinctly, a function  is continuous if and only if whenever  in  then  in  
In general, this the statement would not be true if the word "net" was replaced by "sequence"; that is, it is necessary to allow for directed sets other than just the natural numbers if  is not a first-countable space (or not a sequential space).

() 
Let  be continuous at point  and let  be a net such that 

() 
Let  be a point such that for every net  such that  Now suppose that  is not continuous at 

It follows that  is not in 

This is a contradiction so  must be continuous at  This completes the proof. 

Compactness

A space  is compact if and only if every net  in  has a subnet with a limit in  This can be seen as a generalization of the Bolzano–Weierstrass theorem and Heine–Borel theorem.

() 
First, suppose that  is compact. We will need the following observation (see finite intersection property). Let  be any non-empty set and  be a collection of closed subsets of  such that  for each finite  Then  as well.

Let  be a net in  directed by  For every  define

The collection  has the property that every finite subcollection has non-empty intersection. Thus, by the remark above, we have that

and this is precisely the set of cluster points of  By the proof given in the next section, it is equal to the set of limits of convergent subnets of  Thus  has a convergent subnet.

() 
Conversely, suppose that every net in  has a convergent subnet.

Cluster and limit points

The set of cluster points of a net is equal to the set of limits of its convergent subnets.

Let  be a net in a topological space  (where as usual  automatically assumed to be a directed set) and also let  If  is a limit of a subnet of  then  is a cluster point of 

Conversely, assume that  is a cluster point of 

A net has a limit if and only if all of its subnets have limits. In that case, every limit of the net is also a limit of every subnet.

Other properties

In general, a net in a space  can have more than one limit, but if  is a Hausdorff space, the limit of a net, if it exists, is unique. This result depends on the directedness condition; a set indexed by a general preorder or partial order may have distinct limit points even in a Hausdorff space.

Cauchy nets

A Cauchy net generalizes the notion of Cauchy sequence to nets defined on uniform spaces.

A net  is a  if for every entourage  there exists  such that for all   is a member of  More generally, in a Cauchy space, a net  is Cauchy if the filter generated by the net is a Cauchy filter.

A topological vector space (TVS) is called  if every Cauchy net converges to some point. A normed space, which is a special type of topological vector space, is a complete TVS (equivalently, a Banach space) if and only if every Cauchy sequence converges to some point (a property that is called ). Although Cauchy nets are not needed to describe completeness of normed spaces, they are needed to describe completeness of more general (possibly non-normable) topological vector spaces.

Relation to filters

A filter is another idea in topology that allows for a general definition for convergence in general topological spaces. The two ideas are equivalent in the sense that they give the same concept of convergence. More specifically, for every filter base an  can be constructed, and convergence of the filter base implies convergence of the associated net—and the other way around (for every net there is a filter base, and convergence of the net implies convergence of the filter base). For instance, any net  in  induces a filter base of tails  where the filter in  generated by this filter base is called the net's . This correspondence allows for any theorem that can be proven with one concept to be proven with the other. For instance, continuity of a function from one topological space to the other can be characterized either by the convergence of a net in the domain implying the convergence of the corresponding net in the codomain, or by the same statement with filter bases.

Robert G. Bartle argues that despite their equivalence, it is useful to have both concepts. He argues that nets are enough like sequences to make natural proofs and definitions in analogy to sequences, especially ones using sequential elements, such as is common in analysis, while filters are most useful in algebraic topology. In any case, he shows how the two can be used in combination to prove various theorems in general topology.

Limit superior

Limit superior and limit inferior of a net of real numbers can be defined in a similar manner as for sequences. Some authors work even with more general structures than the real line, like complete lattices.

For a net  put

Limit superior of a net of real numbers has many properties analogous to the case of sequences. For example,

where equality holds whenever one of the nets is convergent.

See also

Citations

References

 
 
 
  
  
 
 
 
  
  

Articles containing proofs
General topology